"Mass Appeal" is a song by American hip hop group Gang Starr from the album Hard to Earn. The song reached #67 on the Billboard Hot 100 and #42 on the Billboard R&B chart. It was also featured on the soundtrack of the video game Tony Hawk's Pro Skater 4.

Background
According to DJ Premier, "Mass Appeal" was recorded to poke fun at radio when it came to hip hop music:

"It was recorded as a joke. We just wanted to make fun of the radio on what it sounded like to get airplay. That’s why I made the background melody real simplistic. I was making fun of the radio, but I’m going to make a funky version of making fun of it. Everything’s a vision, and your brain has to be that intense to be able to capture that. What the radio played, when it came to hip-hop, it sounded too watered down. That was making fun of it, but that record did real good for us".

The track samples Vic Juris' 1980 song "Horizon Drive." as well as vocals from Pete Rock's remix of Da Youngsta's 1992 track Pass Da Mic

Music video
The music video was released in March 1994, shortly after Hard to Earn was released. The first verse featured Guru rapping inside an old apartment complex. The second verse featured Guru rapping inside a moving car, and the third verse featured Guru rapping on a beach. DJ Premier mentioned the video was filmed on a very cold night in Far Rockaway.

Charts

References 

1994 songs
1994 singles
Gang Starr songs
Song recordings produced by DJ Premier
Songs written by DJ Premier
Chrysalis Records singles